Eucalyptus silvestris is a species of mallee or small tree that is endemic to Victoria, Australia. It has rough, fibrous or flaky bark on the trunk and larger branches, smooth greyish brown bark above, glossy green, lance-shaped leaves, flower buds usually in groups of seven, white flowers and conical to cup-shaped fruit.

Description
Flowering occurs in autumn and the flowers are white.

Taxonomy
Eucalyptus silvestris was first formally described in 1994 by Kevin James Rule from material he collected near Yanac, north of Nhill, Victoria in 1990. The specific epithet (silvestris) is derived from Latin, referring to the woodland habitat of this species.

Distribution and habitat
This eucalypts occurs in scattered locations in undulating farmland on well-drained rises from Servicton and Yanac in Victoria, to between Bordertown and Bangham in South Australia.

See also
List of Eucalyptus species

References

Trees of Australia
silvestris
Myrtales of Australia
Flora of Victoria (Australia)
Flora of South Australia
Plants described in 1994